Questing is an outdoor locating game.

Questing may also refer to:
 Questing (horse), a racehorse
 Questing (New Marlborough, Massachusetts), an open space preserve and historic site
 Questing Beast (also known as "The Questing"), a mythological creature of Arthurian legends